Ohad Saidof (born 1 October 1987) is a former Israeli footballer. He made his debut in the Liga Leumit while on loan to Ramat HaSharon.

On July 23, 2014, signed to Hapoel Katamon Jerusalem.

References

1987 births
Living people
Israeli footballers
Beitar Jerusalem F.C. players
Hapoel Nir Ramat HaSharon F.C. players
Hapoel Katamon Jerusalem F.C. players
Hapoel Hadera F.C. players
Nordia Jerusalem F.C. players
Israeli Premier League players
Liga Leumit players
Footballers from Jerusalem
Israeli people of Kurdish-Jewish descent
Association football goalkeepers